This is a list of International Mixed Martial Arts Federation (IMMAF) championships across continental associations and various formats.

World Championships

2014 IMMAF World Championships of Amateur MMA 
The first IMMAF World Championships of Amateur MMA were held between 29 June and 5 July 2014 in Las Vegas, Nevada (U.S.). The tournament took place over four days at Cox Pavilion at the University of Nevada, Las Vegas, with the finals taking place inside the UFC Fan Expo at Mandalay Bay on 5 July.

Medalists 
Men

Women

2015 IMMAF World Championships of Amateur MMA 
The 2015 IMMAF World Championships of Amateur MMA took place at Las Vegas, Nevada (USA), as the International Mixed Martial Arts Federation (IMMAF) returned for the tournament's second year.

The 2015 Championships took place during the fourth annual UFC International Fight Week, from Monday, July 6 to Saturday, July 11, 2015. The fan experience was billed as the world's largest mixed martial arts celebration, guaranteeing high-energy, all-star entertainment and concluding with a weekend of action-packed fights including UFC 189 on July 11.

Medalists 
Men

Women

2016 IMMAF World Championships of Amateur MMA 
The IMMAF World Championships of Amateur MMA returns to Las Vegas as part of the 5th Annual UFC International Fight Week™, the world's largest celebration of combat sports, taking place from Tuesday, July 5 – Sunday, July 10.

The 2016 IMMAF World Championships will be hosted at the Las Vegas Convention Center during the week, with the championships featured on July 10 at the UFC Fan Expo®.

Hosted by the global governing body for amateur MMA, the IMMAF's third iteration of its five-day tournament, will air its post-event highlights on UFC FIGHT PASS®, along with other international television platforms.

Medalists 
Men

Women

2017 IMMAF World Championships of Amateur MMA 
The 2017 IMMAF World Championships of Amateur MMA took place in Manama, Bahrain at Khalifa Sports City Arena from 12 to 19 November.

Medalists 
Men

Women

2018 IMMAF World Championships of Amateur MMA 
The 2018 IMMAF – WMMAA Unified World Championships took place at Khalifa Sport City arena in Manama, Bahrain from 11 to 18 November 2018, hosted by the Bahrain Mixed Martial Arts Federation and with support from the Bahrain Olympic Committee, as part of BRAVE Combat Week.

Medalists 
Men

Women

2019 IMMAF World Championships of Amateur MMA 
The IMMAF | WMMAA World Amateur MMA Championships return to Manama this November from 11 to 16, 2019, as part of BRAVE International Combat Week, for the third year running.

The International Mixed Martial Arts Federation’s 2019 Senior and Junior World Championship tournaments will take place at Khalifa Sport City over five days, hosted by the Bahrain Mixed Martial Arts Federation under the Bahrain Olympic Committee. Commencing on Sunday 10 November with the Tournament Draw and Opening Ceremony, the competitions will play out from Monday 11 to Thursday 14 with the Finals on Saturday 16. Bahraini promotion BRAVE will host a professional MMA night on Friday 15 at the same arena.

Medalists 
Men

Women

2021 IMMAF World Championships of Amateur MMA 
The 2021 IMMAF World Championships of Amateur MMA took place at Abu Dhabi, United Arab Emirates from 24 to 29 January 2022.

Medalists 
Men

Women

World Cup

2021 IMMAF World Cup 
The 2021 IMMAF World Cup took place at Prague, Czech Republic from 8 to 11 September 2021.

Medalists 
Men

Women

Super Cup

2022 MMA Super Cup 
The 2022 BRAVE MMA World Cup took place at Khalifa Sports City Arena, Bahrain from 8 to 12 March 2022. It was organised by the IMMAF, KHK Sports, Bahrain MMA Federation, and BRAVE Combat Federation

Medalists

European Championships

2015 IMMAF European Open Championships of Amateur MMA 
The 2015 IMMAF European Open Championships of Amateur MMA took place at Birmingham, England, United Kingdom from the 19 to 22 November 2015.

The foundational European event took place in Birmingham at the Walsall Sports Centre at the University of Wolverhampton and was broadcast post-event on UFC Fight Pass and international television.

Medalists 
Men

Women

2016 IMMAF European Open Championships of Amateur MMA 
The 2016 IMMAF European Open Championships of Amateur MMA took place in Prague from 22 to 26 November.

Hosted by the Czech Mixed Martial Arts Association (MMAA), the International Mixed Martial Arts Federation's nation vs. nation tournament plays out in 2 rings across 5 days and features more than 170 Athletes from 30 countries worldwide.

The 2016 IMMAF European Open Championships of Amateur MMA will feature on UFC FIGHT PASS and international broadcast channels, post-event.

Medalists 
Men

Women

2017 IMMAF European Open Championships of Amateur MMA 
The 2017 IMMAF European Open Championships of Amateur MMA took place at Sofia, Bulgaria from 29 March to 2 April.

Medalists 
Men

Women

2018 IMMAF European Open Championships of Amateur MMA 
The 2018 IMMAF European Open Championships of Amateur MMA took place at Bucharest, Romania from 18 to 22 June.

Medalists 
Men

Women

2019 IMMAF European Open Championships of Amateur MMA 
The 2019 IMMAF European Open Championships of Amateur MMA took place at Rome, Italy from 18 to 23 June.

Medalists 
Men

Women

2021 IMMAF European Open Championships of Amateur MMA 
The 2021 IMMAF European Open Championships of Amateur MMA took place at Kazan, Russia from 16 to 20 August.

Medalists 
Men

Women

African Championships

2016 IMMAF Africa Open Championships 
The 2016 IMMAF Africa Open Championships commence on Tuesday 30 August and run until the 4 September 2016 at the Brakpan Indoor Sports Centre in Johannesburg.

Hosted by the International Mixed Martial Arts Federation (IMMAF) in association with Mixed Martial Arts South Africa (MMASA) the tournament is Amateur MMA competitors from IMMAF member countries from all across the world. The Africa Open Championships permits 2 representatives per country for each weight class and 4 for the host country, spanning Strawweight to Lightweight for women and Flyweight to Super Heavyweight for men.

The 2016 IMMAF Africa Open Championships will feature on UFC FIGHT PASS and international broadcast channels, post-event.

Medalists 
Men

Women

Asian Championships

2017 IMMAF Asian Open Championships 
The 2017 IMMAF Asian Open Championships took place at Singapore from 12 to 16 June.

Medalists 
Men

Women

2019 IMMAF Asian Open Championships 
The 2019 IMMAF Asian Open Championships took place at Bangkok, Thailand from 1 to 4 May.

Medalists 
Men

Women

References

External links

International Mixed Martial Arts Federation